The Women's time trial at the 2000 UCI Road World Championships took place over a distance of  in Plouay, France on 11 October 2000.

Final classification

Source

References

Women's Time Trial
UCI Road World Championships – Women's time trial
Road World Championships - Women's Time Trial
2000 in women's road cycling